The 1996 NCAA Women's Division I Swimming and Diving Championships were contested at the 15th annual NCAA-sanctioned swim meet to determine the team and individual national champions of Division I women's collegiate swimming and diving in the United States. 

This year's events were hosted by the University of Michigan at the Donald B. Canham Natatorium in Ann Arbor, Michigan. 

Four-time defending champions Stanford again topped the team standings, finishing 81 points ahead of SMU. It was the Cardinal's eighth overall women's team title.

Team standings
Note: Top 10 only
(H) = Hosts
(DC) = Defending champions
Full results

See also
List of college swimming and diving teams

References

NCAA Division I Swimming And Diving Championships
NCAA Division I Swimming And Diving Championships
NCAA Division I Women's Swimming and Diving Championships
Sports in Ann Arbor, Michigan